The Blue Ridge Regional Library (SBRL) is a library system that serves counties in Virginia. The library system is within Region 2 of the Virginia Library Association (VLA).

Service area 
According to the FY 2014 Institute of Museum and Library Services Data Catalog, the Library System has a service area population of 86,403 with 1 central library in Martinsville, Virginia and 4 branch libraries in Bassett, Collinsville, Stuart, and in Ridgeway.

Branches 
 Basset Branch
 Collinsville Branch
 Martinsville Main Branch
 Patrick County Branch
 Ridgeway Branch

References

External links 
 Blue Ridge Regional Library

Public libraries in Virginia
Education in Martinsville, Virginia
Education in Patrick County, Virginia
Education in Henry County, Virginia